Cecil Tarik Gray (born February 16, 1968) is a former American football offensive tackle and defensive end who played for six seasons in the National Football League (NFL). He played for the Philadelphia Eagles from 1990 to 1991, the Green Bay Packers in 1992, the New Orleans Saints in 1993, the Indianapolis Colts from 1993 to 1994, and the Arizona Cardinals in 1995. He was drafted by the Eagles in the ninth round of the 1990 NFL Draft. He played college football at North Carolina.

Gray was placed on the injured reserve list by the Eagles on September 11, 1991.

Graduated from Norfolk Catholic High School in Norfolk, Virginia in 1986.

References

External links
 

1968 births
Living people
American football defensive ends
American football offensive tackles
Arizona Cardinals players
Green Bay Packers players
Indianapolis Colts players
New Orleans Saints players
North Carolina Tar Heels football players
Philadelphia Eagles players
Archbishop Molloy High School alumni
Sportspeople from Manhattan
Players of American football from New York City
Players of American football from Norfolk, Virginia